Thomas Wlodarczyk (born March 4, 1974), better known by his stage name Miilkbone, is an American rapper and songwriter.

Career
Miilkbone began his career by recording cassettes with Biz Markie, eventually becoming an affiliate of Naughty by Nature. He signed a record deal with Capitol Records in 1993 and released his debut album, Da' Miilkrate on June 21, 1995. The album featured two singles, "Keep It Real", and "Where'z Da' Party At ?", which were minor hits on the rap charts.

After a four-year hiatus caused by the shutting down of Capitol's urban department, Miilkbone resurfaced in 1999, appearing on Death Row Records' Chronic 2000 compilation. His track, "Presenting Miilkbone" was an answer record to Eminem's "Just Don't Give a Fuck", in which the latter attacked several other white rappers and said he would "crush a Miilkbone". Two years later, Miilkbone released his second album U Got Miilk ? through Lightyear Entertainment. He then dropped out of the public eye to spend more time with his wife and son.

In March 2014, Miilkbone announced that he had begun working on his third studio album Voice of Reason. On February 28, 2015, Miilkbone released his first mixtape titled "Da Miilktape" through Struggle Enterprise as a teaser for the upcoming album. Voice of Reason was released on October 20, 2015, through Black Island Music and The Orchard/Sony, and features guest appearances by Chino XL, Black Rob, Uncle Murda, and Treach.

Discography

Studio albums

Singles

References

External links
Official website (archived)
Official YouTube channel

American people of Polish descent
Capitol Records artists
Rappers from New Jersey
Living people
People from Perth Amboy, New Jersey
1974 births
20th-century American rappers